Rabka may refer to the following places:

 Rabka, Tibet, a village in China
 Rabka-Zdrój, a town in Poland